Syltefjord Chapel is a chapel of the Church of Norway in Båtsfjord Municipality in Troms og Finnmark county, Norway. It is located in the now-abandoned (uninhabited) village of Nordfjord. It was an annex chapel for the Båtsfjord parish which is part of the Varanger prosti (deanery) in the Diocese of Nord-Hålogaland. The small, white, wooden chapel was built in a long church style in 1934. The church seats about 60 people.

The small wooden chapel was originally built in 1934 in the village of Makkaur. The village was abandoned after World War II and the chapel was then moved to the village of Nordfjord, along the Syltefjorden. It is no longer regularly used, since the village is no longer inhabited. The area still is used for vacationers in the summer, and the chapel is occasionally used for special events.

See also
List of churches in Nord-Hålogaland

References

Båtsfjord
Churches in Finnmark
Wooden churches in Norway
20th-century Church of Norway church buildings
Churches completed in 1934
1934 establishments in Norway
Long churches in Norway